The 2016 Regional Women's Twenty20 Championship was the third season of the women's Twenty20 cricket competition played in the West Indies. It took place in July 2016, with 6 teams taking part and all matches taking place at Providence Stadium in Guyana. Trinidad and Tobago won the tournament, beating Jamaica in the final to claim their first T20 title.

The tournament followed the 2016 Regional Women's Championship.

Competition format 
The six teams were divided into two groups of three, and played three matches in the group stage: against the two other teams in their group and one 'cross-zone' match against a team from the other group. Matches were played using a Twenty20 format. Following the group stage, the top two teams went into the final to determine the Champions, whilst the second-placed teams played a 3rd-place play-off and the third-placed teams played a 5th-place play-off.

The group worked on a points system with positions being based on the total points. Points were awarded as follows:

Win: 3 points 
Loss: 0 points.
Abandoned/No Result: 2 points.

Points tables

Zone A

Zone B

Source: Windies Cricket

 Advanced to the Final
 Advanced to the 3rd-place play-off
 Advanced to the 5th-place play-off

Play-offs

5th-place play-off

3rd-place play-off

Final

Statistics

Most runs

Source: Windies Cricket

Most wickets

Source: Windies Cricket

References

External links
 Series home at Windies Cricket

Twenty20 Blaze
2016 in West Indian cricket